Rafael Alejandro Figueroa Gómez (born March 14, 1983, in Torreón, Coahuila) is a retired Mexican defender.

Club career
With more than 100 caps in First Division, one has become an unquestionable player. Without being a virtuoso he is highly effective and is a fundamental piece of the remaining of Santos Laguna in Primera División de México, as well as of the first place and second place of the Apertura 2007 and Clausura 2008 respectively.
Rafa Figueroa passed a long process in the inferior divisions and the First Division, with Estudiantes de Santander in 2003 - 2004 and With Leon in 2004–2005 to make debut finally the 20 of August 2005 in Culiacán, game that Santos won 3–0.
He began playing like a lateral, at a time at which Santos were  perforated with little budget and many players from the institution. Nevertheless, he is the only one that remained after the reorganization of the club.

Honors

Santos Laguna
 Primera Division de Mexico: Clausura 2008, Clausura 2012, Clausura 2015
 Copa MX: Apertura 2014

External links

1983 births
Living people
Sportspeople from Torreón
Footballers from Coahuila
Association football defenders
Mexican footballers
Santos Laguna footballers
Leones Negros UdeG footballers
Liga MX players